Peltaea is a genus of flowering plants belonging to the family Malvaceae.

Its native range is Southwestern Mexico to Tropical America.

Species
Species:

Peltaea brasiliana 
Peltaea chiquitana 
Peltaea edouardii 
Peltaea heringeri 
Peltaea krapovickasiorum 
Peltaea lasiantha 
Peltaea macedoi 
Peltaea nudicaulis 
Peltaea obsita 
Peltaea ovata 
Peltaea parviflora 
Peltaea polymorpha 
Peltaea riedelii 
Peltaea rupestris 
Peltaea sessiliflora 
Peltaea speciosa 
Peltaea steinbachii 
Peltaea stellata 
Peltaea subpandurata 
Peltaea surumuensis 
Peltaea trinervis

References

Hibisceae
Malvaceae genera